Maynard Elliott Solomon (January 5, 1930 – September 28, 2020) was an American music executive and musicologist, a co-founder of Vanguard Records as well as a music producer. Later, he became known for his biographical studies of Viennese Classical composers, specifically Beethoven (writing an influential biography and an award-winning collection of essays), Mozart (biography), and Schubert. Solomon was the first to openly propose the highly disputed theory of Schubert's homosexuality in a scholarly setting.

Education
Having attended New York's High School of Music & Art, Solomon graduated Phi Beta Kappa from Brooklyn College, CUNY, with a BA in 1950, subsequently pursuing graduate studies at Columbia University from 1950 to 1952. In 1979 he became adjunct associate professor at the Graduate School, CUNY, and between 1988 and 1994 held visiting professorships at SUNY Stony Brook, Columbia University, Harvard University and Yale University, joining the graduate faculty of the Juilliard School of Music in 1998.

Career in the recording industry
Maynard Solomon founded Vanguard Records jointly with his brother Seymour Solomon in 1950. They started the business with a $10,000 loan from their father, Seymour becoming company president and Maynard, the younger brother, vice president. The label was one of the prime movers in the folk and blues boom for the next fifteen years. As well as producing many albums, Solomon was a prolific writer of liner notes.

His nascent venture's first disc was of J.S. Bach's 21st cantata, "Ich hatte viel Bekümmernis, BWV 21" ("I had much grief"), with Jonathan Sternberg conducting Hugues Cuénod and other soloists, chorus and orchestra. "What speaks for the Solomons' steadfastness in their taste and their task", wrote a Billboard journalist in November 1966, "is that this record is still alive in the catalogue (SC-501). As Seymour says, it was a good performance, not easy to top. Of the whole Vanguard/Bach Guild catalogue, numbering about 480 issues, 30 are Bach records..."

Vanguard's first non-classical signing was The Weavers. They generated the first major commercial success for the label with that group's 1955 Carnegie Hall concert. Solomon also acquired the rights to record and release material from the Newport Folk Festival, which meant he could issue recordings by artists who had not actually signed with Vanguard. In this period, Elektra was the main competitor for folk artists. Their singers, Phil Ochs and Judy Collins, were recorded at Newport, as was dynamic young Columbia artist Bob Dylan. The Solomons continued to work with folk artists up until the 1980s.

In 1959, the company signed Joan Baez, who would remain with the Vanguard label for the next twelve years. Two years later, they recorded Odetta at Town Hall (New York). The Rooftop Singers recorded "Walk Right In" in 1963, a hit on both sides of the Atlantic produced by Solomon along with some of their other songs. Unfortunately their next single, "Tom Cat," was banned for being slightly suggestive, though tame by modern standards. It was probably Solomon's influence that induced Baez to record "Bachianas Brasileiras No. 5" by Villa-Lobos.

Solomon insisted on a clean appearance on stage, and clear diction, views in accord with majority public opinion at the time. More bravely, he signed Paul Robeson for Vanguard at the height of the McCarthy era.

Solomon's belief in Marxism was a driving force in these early years, but it was not until 1973 that his writings explicitly reflected this. His book Marxism and Art from that year has been continuously in print since then.

In the late 1960s Vanguard had some success with rock artists, most notably "Country Joe and the Fish" (today usually called Country Joe McDonald), along with some jazz, blues or disco records that have not stood the test of time. One of the most surprising signings he made, in 1969, was Michael Szajkowski, an electronic composer. Szajkowski's material was borrowed from Handel, but the sound, on a synthesizer, was far from classical. Maynard's brother Seymour, however, had previously signed humorous electronic music artists Jean-Jacques Perrey and Gershon Kingsley (Perrey and Kingsley) in 1965. That team's work has stood the test of time: their Vanguard music is still used on commercials, children's television, and elsewhere.

The multiplicity of popular classical music series released by the Solomons on Vanguard and Bach Guild between 1950 and 1966 include, in addition to 22 Bach cantatas, pieces from the English Madrigal School performed by the Deller Consort, Italian and French madrigal masterpieces, Elizabethan and Jacobean music, Henry Purcell and the virtuoso trumpet, virtuoso flute and virtuoso oboe, along with German University Songs with Erich Kunz, songs of the Auvergne, Viennese dances with Willi Boskovsky, traditional songs by Roland Hayes, Vivaldi's Four Seasons and other concertos from I Solisti di Zagreb, music by Ralph Vaughan Williams, numerous Haydn symphonies performed by the Esterhazy Orchestra, a double LP of Gluck's opera Orfeo ed Euridice sung in Italian with the Vienna State Opera Orchestra led by Charles Mackerras, and an influential Mahler cycle with the Utah Symphony conducted by Maurice Abravanel.

As musicologist
Solomon later began a second career as a musicologist, notably as author of composer biographies, and his work (particularly his studies of Mozart and Beethoven) has met with both acclaim and criticism (for overly simplistic psychological interpretations of their subjects).
Characteristic of Solomon's approach is a careful sifting of the scholarly evidence, often with the goal of supporting new hypotheses about the events or motivations of the great composers in question and those around them (for instances, see Maria Anna Mozart, Mozart's Berlin journey, Mozart's name and Antonie Brentano). Solomon is also careful to avoid uncritical repetition of old formulae in composer biographies; for example, like other recent biographers, he characterizes 1791, the last year of Mozart's life, as of personal revival cut off by terminal illness rather than the steady slide toward the grave typical of more traditional biographies. Though Solomon hasn't hesitated to offer specific psychological analyses and diagnoses of his subjects, he has, nevertheless, been criticized by some musicologists for - in their opinion and words - „anachronistic assumptions and a lack of understanding of eighteenth- and nineteenth-century German.“

Solomon's concentration on the life and work of Beethoven resulted in close collaboration with German scholars; in 1996 he was made a scholarly adviser to the Beethoven-Archiv in Bonn, in addition to becoming a member of the editorial committee for the Neue Ausgabe Beethovens Briefe (the New Edition of Beethoven's letters, Munich, 1996–1998).

Solomon became, in 1997, a member of the International Musicological Society, and addressed its congress in London. He was the author of Mozart: A Life, a finalist for the Pulitzer Prize in biography which won the Deems Taylor Award, as did his biography of Beethoven and his study of Charles Ives. His Beethoven Essays won the Otto Kinkeldey Award for most distinguished book on music published in 1988.

An associate editor of American Imago, and co-founder of the Bach Guild (a subsidiary Vanguard record label), he also published articles in applied psychoanalysis and edited several books on aesthetics. His later projects included a life of Schubert and a book tentatively titled Beethoven: Beyond Classicism. 

Solomon died on September 28, 2020 in Manhattan from Lewy body dementia at the age of 90.

Selected discography of records produced by Solomon
 "Best of the Vanguard Years" (2000) (The Clancy Brothers)
 "Best of the Vanguard Years" (2000) (Tom Paxton)
 "Best of the Vanguard Years" (1998) (Ian & Sylvia)
 "Best of the Vanguard Years" (2004) (The Rooftop Singers)
 "Best of the Vanguard Years" (2003) (Buffy Sainte-Marie)
 "Best of John Hammond" (1989) (John Hammond)
 "Best of Eric Andersen" (1970) (Eric Andersen)
 "Vanguard Sessions: Baez Sings Dylan" (1998) (Joan Baez)
 "Reunion at Carnegie Hall, 1963, Pt 1" (2001) (The Weavers)
 "Reunion at Carnegie Hall, 1963, Pt 2" (2001) (The Weavers)

Bibliography
 The Joan Baez Songbook (1964) (by Solomon and Eric Von Schmidt)
 Noel: The Joan Baez Christmas Songbook (1967) (by Joan Baez, Solomon and Eric Von Schmidt)
 Marxism and Art (1973)
 "Beethoven and the Enlightenment". Telos, 19 (Spring 1974). New York: Telos Press.
 Myth Creativity Psychoanalysis: Essays in Honor of Harry Slochower (1979)
 Beethoven (1977, 1998), Beethoven (Second, revised edition, 2001)
 Beethoven's Tagebuch: 1812–1818 (1983)
 Beethoven Essays (1988). Winner of the Otto Kinkeldey Award from the American Musicological Society
 Mozart: A Life (New York, 1995)
 "Franz Schubert and the Peacocks of Benvenuto Cellini", 19th-Century Music, 12 (3) University of California Press: 193–206, 
 (translator) Memories of Beethoven (2003) (by Gerhard von Breuning).
 Late Beethoven: Music, Thought, Imagination (2004)

References

External links
Norman Weinstein (December 4–11, 1997). "Folk'd Up: The Good and the Bad of Vanguard", Boston Phoenix.

1930 births
2020 deaths
American Marxists
American Marxist writers
Harvard University staff
Columbia University alumni
Columbia University staff
American biographers
Mozart scholars
Beethoven scholars
Schubert scholars
American record labels
Classical music record labels
Folk record labels
Reissue record labels
Record labels established in 1950
Brooklyn College alumni
Deaths from dementia in New York (state)
Deaths from Lewy body dementia